Friends Church (formerly Yorba Linda Friends Church) is an evangelical Christian megachurch located in the Orange County city of Yorba Linda, California. The church is affiliated with the Evangelical Friends International denomination . With weekly attendance averaging in excess of 4,000, it is the largest Quaker church in the world and one of the largest churches in Southern California. In addition, the church's worship center (completed in 2006) is one of the largest theaters in California, with a capacity of over 3,000. In 2009, the church was ranked the 54th fastest-growing church in the United States.

History
On June 4, 1911, community residents convened to plan the construction of the first church in Yorba Linda to offer Christian education to local children. In 1912, at a cost of $1,513.63, the Friends Church was organized and built on School Street . The charter members included Frank A. Nixon and Hannah M. Nixon, parents to future United States President Richard M. Nixon. The original structure is now the First Baptist Church.

The Friends Church was moved to a new location in 1928 and again in 1969, which is its current location on Lakeview Avenue. Meetings at the Friends Church took form of unprogrammed worship with spontaneous and enthusiastic displays of religious fervor, characterized by religious scholar Thomas Hamm as a landmark of California evangelicalism.

In the early twenty-first century, the church offered multilingual services and Christian education programs for all age groups. The church distanced itself from the Quaker denomination; it is much more conservative than most Quaker churches and does not espouse the pacifist views of most Quakers.

In 2008, took the name of Yorba Linda Friends Church.

See also 

 John Wimber

References

External links

Friends Church Southwest

Churches in Orange County, California
Evangelical churches in California
Evangelical megachurches in the United States
Megachurches in California
Yorba Linda, California
1912 establishments in California
Quaker organizations established in the 20th century
Christian organizations established in 1912